The Committee On Public Enterprises (COPE) is a parliamentary committee established on July 21, 1979 by the Parliament of Sri Lanka.

Mission
The intention of the committee is to ensure the compliance of financial discipline in Public Corporations and other Semi Governmental bodies in which the Government of Sri Lanka has a financial stake.

Structure
COPE consists of 31 Members reflecting the party composition in the House established under the Standing Order 126 at the beginning of each Parliamentary Session and the Chairman is elected by the Members of the Committee at its first session. Its quorum is four.

Past chairmen

 George Abeygunasekera, M.P.
 M. S. Amarasiri, M.P.
 John Amaratunga, M.P.
 Wimal Wickramasinghe, M.P.
 Rohan Abeygunasekera, M.P.
 D. P. Wickremasinghe, M.P.
 Prof. W. A. Wiswa Warnapala, M.P.
 Reggie Ranatunga, M.P.
 Jeyaraj Fernandopulle, M.P.
 Rohitha Bogollagama, M.P.
 Wijeyadasa Rajapakshe, M.P.
 W. D. J. Senewiratne, M.P.
 D. E. W. Gunasekera, M.P.
Sunil Handunnetti, M.P.

Notable investigations
Sri Lanka Insurance: In 2007, COPE revealed that the privatization process of Sri Lanka Insurance Corporation which undertook in the year 2003 was irregular. As a result of a case filed in the Supreme Court challenging the privatization of Sri Lanka Insurance Corporation, On 4 June 2009, the Supreme Court of Sri Lanka annulled the sale of Sri Lanka Insurance Corporation.

Ceylon Petroleum Corporation: In 2012 August, The Ceylon Petroleum Corporation has been summoned to appear before a committee for the investigations following alleged imports of substandard fuel. Following the probes from the Criminal Investigation Department (CID) and the Bribery Commission, President Mahinda Rajapaksa has instructed his ministers to appoint new chairmen when the present corrupt Heads are removed and to reconstitute all such Boards of Management in state institutions.

Central Bank of Sri Lanka bond issue : In 2016 October COPE revealed that Governor of the Central Bank Arjuna Mahendran should be held responsible for the Bond Issue Scam and legal action should be taken against him. However President Maithripala Sirisena has announced that he has appointed a Commission of Inquiry to further investigate the case.

Sri Lanka Institute of Information Technology: SLIIT was investigated for its alleged misuse of Mahapola Higher Education Scholarship Trust Fund and alienation of state ownership of the Sri Lanka Institute of Information Technology.

References

Further reading
 Imf, World Bank & Adb Agenda on Privatisation, Volume 4 (Google eBook)

External links
 Official website

Government of Sri Lanka
Parliament of Sri Lanka